Yaka, also spelled Iaca and Iyaka, is a Bantu language spoken in the Democratic Republic of the Congo and Angola. There are two dialects, Yaka proper, which comprises 99% of speakers, and Ngoongo (distinguish West Ngongo language). The alleged varieties Pelende and Lonzo are political rather than ethnolinguistic entities.

References

Yaka languages
Languages of the Democratic Republic of the Congo
Languages of Angola